Pact with the Devil  (Italian: Patto col diavolo) is a 1950 Italian melodrama film directed by Luigi Chiarini and starring Isa Miranda, Jacques François and Eduardo Ciannelli. Much of the film was shot on location in Calabria in Southern Italy.

Cast
 Isa Miranda as Marta Larocca
 Jacques François as Andrea Mola  
 Eduardo Ciannelli as Giacomo Mola
 Annibale Betrone as Old Laroccha - Marta's father  
 Guido Celano as Il sottuficiale dei carabinieri  
 Fiore Davanzati as Sarina  
 Umberto Spadaro as Scoppola - the killer  
 Luigi Tosi as Rocco  
 Lamberto Picasso as The priest  
 Anne Vernon as Andrea's sister
 Ave Ninchi as Signora Mola - Giacomo's wife 
 Angelo Dessy 
 Oreste Fares 
 Nico Pepe 
 Camillo Pilotto 
 Checco Rissone 
 Alfredo Robert 
 Jacques Sernas 
 Saro Urzì

References

Bibliography 
 Moliterno, Gino. The A to Z of Italian Cinema. Scarecrow Press, 2009.

External links 
 

1950 films
Italian drama films
1950 drama films
1950s Italian-language films
Films directed by Luigi Chiarini
Films with screenplays by Suso Cecchi d'Amico
Italian black-and-white films
1950s Italian films